Walker's Cay National Park is a marine national park north of Walker's Cay in North Abaco, the Bahamas. The park's marine environment has a barrier reef, which is used for underwater diving and snorkelling.

Flora and fauna
The barrier reef contains coral, and provides habitat for pompano, amberjack, sharks, barracudas, tropical fish, turtles and eagle rays.

References

National parks of the Bahamas
Abaco Islands